The 2017 Uttarakhand Legislative Assembly election were the fourth Vidhan Sabha (Legislative Assembly) election of the state. Elections were held on 15 February 2017 when Bharatiya Janata Party emerged as the single largest party with 57 seats in the 70-seat legislature and formed the government. The Indian National Congress with 11 seats served as the official opposition.

After discussions it was announced that Trivendra Singh Rawat would be Chief Minister.

Party position in the Assembly

Key post holders in the Assembly
 Speaker :  Premchand Aggarwal
 Deputy Speaker : Raghunath Singh Chauhan
 Leader of the House: Trivendra Singh Rawat (2017–2021)Tirath Singh Rawat (2021)Pushkar Singh Dhami (2021–2022) 
 Leader of the Opposition : Indira Hridayesh (2017–2022)Pritam Singh (2021–2022)
 Chief Secretary : Utpal Kumar Singh

List of the Fourth Assembly members

By-elections

See also
 2017 Uttarakhand Legislative Assembly election
 Trivendra Singh Rawat ministry
 Tirath Singh Rawat ministry
 First Dhami ministry
 Politics of Uttarakhand

Notes
 † – Died in office
 A – The reserved seat for the member of Anglo-Indian community was abolished on 25 January 2020 by the 104th Constitutional Amendment Act, 2019, reducing the strength of Assembly from 71 to 70 seats.

References

Uttarakhand Legislative Assembly